Little Rock West High School (LRW), also known as Little Rock West High School of Innovation (LRWHSOI) is a public high school in Little Rock, Arkansas and a part of the Little Rock School District.

The  building has three stories. It is adjacent to Pinnacle View Middle School and is on a  property.

History
Arkansas state level politicians promoted the idea of expanding Pinnacle View Middle School, located in the former headquarters of Leisure Arts, to the high school level. The high school was to be established in a former office building next to Pinnacle View Middle.

Little Rock West opened in 2019 with the ninth grade, having 64 students, and in 2020 it had 120 students. The building has a capacity of about 100 students per grade. The first 12th grade class will graduate in 2023.

References

External links
 Little Rock West High School
 
 Attendance boundary

Public high schools in Arkansas
High schools in Little Rock, Arkansas
Schools in the Little Rock School District
2019 establishments in Arkansas
Educational institutions established in 2019